The Tsakonikos or Tsakonikos horos ( "Tsakonian dance") is a dance performed in the Peloponnese in Greece. It comes from the region, chiefly in Arcadia, known as Tsakonia. It is danced in many towns and villages there with little variation to the steps.

In Ayios Andreas, it is performed as a mixed dance in an open circle, with the hands held up (αγκαζέ angaze, in Greek). The most popular songs for the tsakonikos are "Sou ipa mana kale mana" and "Kinisan ta tsamopoula".

This labyrinthine formation is, according to legend, linked to the Crane dance of Theseus in Greek mythology, who slew the Minotaur in the Labyrinth of King Minos. It has also been linked to the slaying by Apollo of the Python at Delphi.

Song words to the Tsakonikos Dance
ΚΙΝΗΣΑΝΤΑ
Κινῆσαν τὰ - κι ἀμὰν ἀμάν.

Κινῆσαν τὰ - τσανόπουλα.

Κινῆσαν τὰ τσανόπουλα κι’ ὅλα τὰ λεβεντόπουλα.

Καὶ πάν’ στὸν πὲ - κι ἀμὰν ἀμάν,

καὶ πάν’ στὸν πέρα Μαχαλά.

Καὶ πᾶν’ στὸν πέρα Μαχαλά, ποὺ εἶν

τὰ κορίτσια τὰ καλά.

Κι ἐκεῖ τους πιὰ - κι ἀμὰν ἀμάν,

κι ἐκεῖ τους πιάνει μία βροχή.

Κι ἐκεῖ τους πιάνει μία βροχή, μία σιγανή, μία ταπεινή.

Βραχήκανε κι ἀμὰν ἀμάν,

βραχήκανε τὰ τσάμικα καὶ τ' ἄσπρα τους πουκάμισα.

Μάστε κορὶ - κι ἀμὰν ἀμὰν

μάστε κορίτσια τσάκαλα.

Μάστε κορίτσια τσάκαλα, στεγνῶστε τὰ πουκάμισα 

(figurative translation)

So they went, the Tsakon youth

So went the Tsakon youth and all the lads

And off they go - aman aman

And off they go to yonder Mahala, where

the girls are fine

And there they were caught in - aman aman

And there they were caught in a rain

And there they were caught in a rain, a slow, a shy (rain)

They were soaked - aman aman

Soaked were their tsamika (dances) and their white shirts

Girls, gather - aman aman

Girls, gather quick

Girls, gather quick, (to) dry their shirts.

See also
 Greek music
 Greek dances
 Tsamiko
 Sirtaki
 Kalamatianos
 Dora Stratou

References

External links
"The Tsakonian Dance" from the University of Patras (English; incl. photos)
Τσακώνικος Χορός from the University of Patras (Greek; with additional photos & video not available in English-language version 
Video from the 2010 Grand Festival of Greek Dance at Argos 
The Tsakonian Dance By Mpekios and Tsaggouri (Origins, History of the dance and explanations in Greek) 
Lecture and singing of the song Kinisanta in Greek 
 Recording by Diamantis Roumeliotis 
 Folkdance Footnotes 

Greek dances
Tsakonia